Iulian Hartig (born 11 October 1998) is a Romanian rugby union player. He played as a prop for professional SuperLiga club CSM București.

Club career
Hartig started playing rugby as a youth for Romanian club Clubul Sportiv Școlar nr. 2 Baia Mare. In 2017 he was signed by Romanian SuperLiga side, CSM București.

International career
Hartig is also selected for Romania's national team, the Oaks, making his international debut at the 2019 Rugby Europe Championship in a match against Los Leones.

References

External links

1998 births
Living people
Romanian rugby union players
Romania international rugby union players
CSM București (rugby union) players
Rugby union props